{{DISPLAYTITLE:C22H34O2}}
The molecular formula C22H34O2 (molar mass: 330.51 g/mol, exact mass: 330.2559 u) may refer to:

 Anagestone
 Docosapentaenoic acid
 E-EPA
 3β-Methoxypregnenolone
 Topterone

Molecular formulas